Like OpenDisc for English-speaking users, LoLiWin aims to introduce French-speaking users of Microsoft Windows to the benefits of free and open source software (FOSS). It is a DVD image that can freely be downloaded and copied.

See also

 OpenDisc
 GNUWin II
 WinLibre
 Open Source Software CD

References 

Free software distributions